Burkabad (also Romanized as Būrkābād; also known as Borūkābād) is a village in Ojarud-e Sharqi Rural District, Muran District, Germi County, Ardabil Province, Iran. At the 2006 census, its population was 34, in 6 families.

References 

Tageo

Towns and villages in Germi County